Sagace (1980–1989) was a French Thoroughbred champion racehorse. His sire Luthier had been the Leading sire in France in 1976.

Trained by Patrick Biancone and ridden by Yves St. Martin for prominent owner/breeder Daniel Wildenstein, at age three Sagace won two important races, then the following year scored a two-length victory in France's most prestigious horse race, the Prix de l'Arc de Triomphe. Sagace came back to win his second Arc in 1985 but following a claim of interference by the handlers of Rainbow Quest, the Hippodrome de Longchamp racing stewards disqualified him to second. Nonetheless, Sagace's performances for 1985 earned him European Co-Champion Older Horse honors.

When Sagace retired to stud, owner Daniel Widenstein sold a share of him to Alan Li Fook-sum, a prominent Hong Kong horseman who later (1998-2002) served as chairman of the Hong Kong Jockey Club.

Sagace was sent to Calumet Farm in Lexington, Kentucky, where he sired Arcangues, who won the 1993 Breeders' Cup Classic. Sagace stood at stud for just over three years before dying prematurely at age nine. His daughter Saganeca produced Sagamix, who was unbeaten at age three while winning the 1998 Prix de l'Arc de Triomphe.

References
 Sagace's pedigree and racing stats

1980 racehorse births
1989 racehorse deaths
Racehorses bred in Calvados (department)
Racehorses trained in France
Arc winners
Thoroughbred family 16-c
Byerley Turk sire line